Okumiomote Dam   is a dam in the Murakami, Niigata, Japan, officially completed on 28 August 2001.

See also

References 

Dams in Niigata Prefecture
Dams completed in 2001